Hans-Georg Dreßen (born 30 December 1964) is a retired German football player.

Honours
 Bundesliga runner-up: 1989–90
 DFB-Pokal finalist: 1983–84

References

External links
 

1964 births
Living people
German footballers
Germany under-21 international footballers
Borussia Mönchengladbach players
1. FC Köln players
Bundesliga players
Sportspeople from Mönchengladbach
Association football midfielders
Footballers from North Rhine-Westphalia